"The Name of the Game" is a 1977 song by Swedish pop group ABBA, released as the first single from the group's fifth studio album, ABBA: The Album (1977). It became a UK number one, topping the UK Singles Chart for four weeks in November 1977.

Background and release
"The Name of the Game", first called "A Bit of Myself", was the first song to be recorded for ABBA's fifth studio album, following the band's European and Australian tour. It was their most complex composition yet – with Agnetha Fältskog and Anni-Frid Lyngstad sharing the lead vocals but with solo passages from both women – and contained the influences of the laid-back California sound of the day.

The opening riff on bass and synthesizer is inspired by Stevie Wonder's "I Wish" from the 1976 album Songs in the Key of Life, and both Andersson and Ulvaeus have acknowledged being inspired by Wonder's music during this part of ABBA's career.

A preliminary version of "The Name of the Game" was worked into the 1977 feature film ABBA: The Movie, for which it was written. When it was eventually finished, it was released as the lead single from ABBA: The Album in October 1977. Originally, another track entitled "Hole in Your Soul" was intended for release, but those plans were soon shelved. "The Name of the Game" was released with a live version of "I Wonder (Departure)" as the B-side. This B-side was one of several songs written for the mini-musical The Girl with the Golden Hair, written by Ulvaeus and Andersson and originally performed by ABBA on their 1977 world tour. The recording used on "The Name of the Game" single was recorded at Sydney Showground, Sydney, Australia on 3 or 4 March 1977. A studio recorded version of the song was included on ABBA: The Album.

"The Name of The Game" also marks the last time Stig Anderson helped with the lyrics of a single.

Reception
Billboard called "The Name of the Game" one of ABBA's "most stately, dramatic works to date."  Cash Box said that "layers of acoustic guitars play a classic chord progression in the irresistable chorus."  Record World said that "the emotion expressed is again secondary to the compelling nature of the music, as usual simple but dramatic." In 2017, Billboard ranked the song number six on their list of the 15 greatest ABBA songs, and in 2021, Rolling Stone ranked the song number three on their list of the 25 greatest ABBA songs.

"The Name of the Game" topped the UK Singles Chart for 4 weeks. It was the second of three consecutive UK No. 1 singles after "Knowing Me, Knowing You", and before "Take a Chance on Me".

The song was a Top 5 hit in ABBA's native Sweden, Belgium, Finland, Ireland, the Netherlands, New Zealand, Norway, South Africa and Rhodesia, while peaking inside the Top 10 in Australia, West Germany, Switzerland and Mexico. On the US Billboard Hot 100, "The Name of the Game" almost reached the Top 10, peaking at No. 12 on 11–18 March 1978.

As of September 2021, it is ABBA's eight-biggest song in the UK.

An edited version of "The Name of the Game", which omitted the entire second verse of the song, reducing the length of the track from its original 4:51 to 3:58, was released on a promotional single in the US. The US Promo Edit of "The Name of the Game" then – apparently by mistake – found its way onto the 1982 Polar Music compilation The Singles: The First Ten Years, and then onto a number of hits packages issued on both vinyl and CD in the 1980s and early 1990s. This edit also appears on the original 1992 version of the group's Gold: Greatest Hits album. Not until the 1999 remastered edition of Gold: Greatest Hits did the song appear in its entirety on that compilation.

When PolyGram released the first digitally remastered CD version of The Album in 1997, the fact that one of the nine tracks was nearly a minute shorter than it was supposed to be somehow managed to elude the remastering engineers – the US Promo Edit was again used by mistake and the first edition was subsequently withdrawn.

"The Name of the Game" was sampled in 1996 by the Fugees for their hit "Rumble in the Jungle", the first time that an ABBA song had been legally sampled by another act.

Music video
Like most of ABBA's videos, the video was directed and shot by Lasse Hallström. During the video, the four members of the group are shown playing the board game "Fia-spel", the Scandinavian version of the German board game "Mensch ärgere dich nicht", which is a variation of the English board game Ludo and American Parcheesi.

Charts

Weekly charts

Year-end charts

Certifications and sales

Cover versions

In 1977, a cover of the song was featured on the album Top of the Pops, Volume 62, using uncredited studio musicians and singers. The same recording was later featured on the ABBA tribute album Knowing Me, Knowing You, credited to Top of the Poppers.
In 1995, on the New Zealand compilation Abbasalutely the song is covered by Shaynie & Fifi '95 (a one-off duo comprising Shayne Carter and Fiona McDonald).
In 1997, The SAS Band – Spike Edney's All Stars – covered the song on their eponymous debut album with English singer Chris Thompson on lead vocals.
In 1995 Any Trouble covered the song.
In 1999, Swedish pop group A-Teens covered the song on their debut album, The ABBA Generation. Their version, like the U.S. release, omits the second verse.
In the late 1990s, a dance cover by Abbacadabra was released through Almighty Records.  An audio sample can be heard on the official Almighty Records website.
Musician/songwriter Pamela McNeill recorded a slow ballad version of the song on her Tribute To ABBA album, which was produced by her husband Dugan McNeill.
In 2004, American-born German singer Sydney Youngblood covered the song for the German compilation ABBA Mania.
In 2004, Swedish musician Nils Landgren includes a cover on his album Funky ABBA.
In 2006, a cover of the song by Eurosonic was included on the chill out music compilation ABBA Chill Out.
In the stage musical Mamma Mia!, the song is performed by the characters of Sophie and Bill.
In the 2008 film adaptation, Amanda Seyfried and Stellan Skarsgård performed the song in a scene that was ultimately cut.
The song was again performed in the sequel, Mamma Mia! Here We Go Again, this time by Lily James.
In 2018, Cher covered the song on her twenty-sixth studio album Dancing Queen, an album made up of ABBA covers.
In 2020, Gabi DeMartino covered the song, in a medley along with "Mamma Mia" titled "Mamma Mia 2 Medley" on her debut extended play, Gabroadway.

References

External links
 

ABBA songs
1970s ballads
1977 singles
European Hot 100 Singles number-one singles
UK Singles Chart number-one singles
Polar Music singles
Songs written by Stig Anderson
Songs written by Benny Andersson and Björn Ulvaeus
Music videos directed by Lasse Hallström
Pop ballads
Torch songs
1977 songs